The following is a detailed discography of all albums released by country music singer Willie Nelson, since his professional debut in 1962. Nelson's discography includes 99 studio albums (consisting of 73 solo studio albums and 26 collaborative studio albums), 14 live albums, 51 compilation albums and 41 video albums as well as the soundtracks of The Electric Horseman and Honeysuckle Rose.

His albums have been successful in many countries, especially New Zealand, Australia and some European countries. Nelson has sold more than 40 million albums in the United States alone.

Studio albums

1960s

1970s

1980s

1990s

2000s

2010s

2020s

Live albums

Compilation albums

1970s

1980s
{| class="wikitable plainrowheaders" style="text-align:center;"
|-
! rowspan="2" style="width:18em;"| Title
! rowspan="2" style="width:18em;"| Details
! colspan="4"| Peak chart positions
! rowspan="2"| Certifications
|- style="font-size:smaller;"
! width="40"| US Country
! width="40"| US
! width="40"| AUS
! width="40"| NZ
|-
! scope="row"| Danny Davis & Willie Nelson with the Nashville Brass
|align="left"| 
 Release date: February 11, 1980
 RCA Victor
|14
|—
|—
|—
|
|-
! scope="row"| Always
| align="left"| 
 Release date: 1980
 Label: Sony
| —
| —
| 4
| 7
| align="left"| 
 AUS: Platinum
 NZ: Platinum
|-
! scope="row"| His Very Best
| align="left"| 
 Release date: 1980
 Label: Time Music
| —
| —
| —
| —
| align="left"| 
 CAN: 2× Platinum
|-
! scope="row"| Greatest Hits (& Some That Will Be)
| align="left"| 
 Release date: 1981
 Label: Columbia Records
| 1
| 27
| —
| —
| align="left"| 
 US: 4× Platinum
 CAN: Platinum
|-
! scope="row"| The Minstrel Man
| align="left"| 
 Release date: 1981
 Label: RCA Records
| 39
| 148
| —
| —
|
|-
! scope="row"| Everybody's Talkin'''
| align="left"| 
 Release date: 1981
 Label: JB
| —
| —
| 25
| —
| align="left"| 
 AUS: Gold
|-
! scope="row"| The Best of Willie Nelson| align="left"| 
 Release date: 1982
 Label: Capitol Records
| 62
| 201
| —
| —
|
|-
! scope="row"| 20 of the Best| align="left"| 
 Release date: 1982
 Label: RCA Records
| —
| —
| —
| —
|
|-
! scope="row"| The Winning Hand 
| align="left"| 
 Release date: December 1982
 Label: Monument
| 4
| 109
| —
| —
| 
|-
! scope="row"| Songs from My Heart| align="left"| 
 Release date: 1984
 Label: RCA Records
| —
| —
| —
| —
|
|-
! scope="row"| Collectors Series| align="left"| 
 Release date: 1985
 Label: RCA Records
| 62
| —
| —
| —
|
|-
! scope="row"| Half Nelson| align="left"| 
 Release date: 1985
 Label: Columbia Records
| 10
| 178
| —
| —
| align="left"| 
 US: Platinum
|-
! scope="row"| Love Songs| align="left"| 
 Release date: 1986
 Label: EMD International
| —
| —
| 22
| —
| align="left"| 
 AUS: Gold
|-
! scope="row"| Walking the Line 
| align="left"| 
 Release date: June 16, 1987
 Label: Epic
| 39
| —
| —
| —
| 
|-
! scope="row"| Collection| align="left"| 
 Release date: 1988
 Label: CBS Records
| —
| —
| —
| —
|
|-
! scope="row"| Evergreens| align="left"|
Release date: 1988
 Label: Columbia Records
| —
| —
| —
| —
|
|-
| colspan="7" style="font-size:8pt"| "—" denotes releases that did not chart
|-
|}

1990s

2000s

2010s

Soundtrack albums

Video albums and television specials

Other appearances

 Live 

 Guest 

Notes
A^ Milk Cow Blues peaked at number 9 on the RPM Country Albums chart.
B^ American Classic peaked at number 19 on the Canadian Albums Chart.
C^ Willie and Family Live peaked at number 1 on the RPM Country Albums chart and number 35 on the RPM Top Albums chart.

References

Johnson, Thomas S. "Willie Nelson: A Discographic Listing." Monograph. Four Editions.  Willie Nelson Fan Club, 1981–1985.

External links
A 2023 revised ranking of 150 Willie Nelson albums from Texas Monthly''

Country music discographies

Discographies of American artists